Christian Lammert (born 10 January 1969) is a German political scientist.

Life 
Born  in Offenbach am Main, Lammert teaches as professor for North American domestic policy at the John F. Kennedy Institute for North American Studies of the Free University of Berlin and is research associate at the Zentrum für Nordamerika-Forschung (ZENAF) of the Goethe University Frankfurt. 

Lammert received his doctorate in 2002 with his dissertation Regional Movements and State Power in Canada and France at the Faculty of social science of the University of Frankfurt am Main. From 2001 to 2008 he was a research assistant at ZENAF and at the Chair of political science with a focus on "Comparative Politics". (Hans-Jürgen Puhle).

Lammert's research interests include comparative politics, political systems in Canada and US, comparative welfare state research, tax and social policy, nationalism research, and multiculturalism.

Since 2017, Lammert has been head of the "Political Science and Sociology" section in the Society for Canadian Studies.

Monographs and anthologies 
 Politik in den USA. Institutionen – Akteure – Themen. Published with Christoph M. Haas/Simon Koschut. Kohlhammer, Stuttgart 2018
 Sozialpolitik in den USA. Eine Einführung, with Britta Grell. Springer VS, Wiesbaden 2013
 Travelling Concepts. Negotiating Diversity in Canada and Europe. Edited with Katja Sarkowsky (Conference publication of a Deutsche Forschungsgemeinschaft-funded international and interdisciplinary conference of April 2007), VS-Verlag 2010
 Nationale Bewegungen in Québec and Corsica 1960–2000. Campus, Frankfurt 2004 
 Staat, Nation, Demokratie. Tradition und Perspektiven moderner Gesellschaften. Vandenhoeck & Ruprecht, Göttingen 2001

References

External links 
 FU Berlin: Christian Lammert (retrieved 8 November 2019).
 Homepage Christian Lammert Professor of North American Politics (retrieved 8 November 2019).

German political scientists
Academic staff of the Free University of Berlin
Canada–Germany relations
1969 births
Living people
People from Offenbach am Main